This is a list of notable people who were born in or associated with Mainz.

Sons and daughters of the town 

(chronological list)
 around 780, Rabanus Maurus, † 856, a Benedictine monk, and archbishop of Mainz. He was the author of the encyclopaedia On the Nature of Things
 (c. 960 -1040? or 1028?) Gershom ben Judah, also commonly known by the longer title "Rabbeinu Gershom Me'Or Hagolah" ("Our teacher Gershom the light of the exile"), a famous Talmudist and Halakhist
 around 1397, Johannes Gutenberg (also Johannes Gensfleisch zur Laden), † February 3, 1468 in Mainz, a goldsmith and inventor. He achieved fame for his invention of the technology of printing with movable types during 1447
 ? Johann Fust († 1466 in Paris), an early German printer, assistant and investor of Gutenberg. Together with Peter Schöffer he founded a printshop
 1488, Otto Brunfels, a German theologian and botanist. Carl von Linné listed him among the "Fathers of Botany"
 1674, Friedrich Carl von Schönborn († 1746), bishop of Bamberg and Würzburg (1729–46)
 1745, Ludwig Fischer, † July 19, 1825 in Berlin, opera singer
 1750, Wolfgang Heribert von Dalberg, † September 28, 1806 in Mannheim, chamberlain of Worms and intendant of the theatre at Mannheim
Ferdinand Ochsenheimer (1767–1822) was a German stage actor and entomologist (lepidopterist)
 1779, October 8, Johann Baptist Ziz, † December 1, 1829, botanist
 1780, Johann Adam Ackermann, † 1853, landscape painter
 1791, Franz Bopp, 1867 in Berlin, German linguist, author of comparative studies on Indo-European languages
 1805, Ida, Countess von Hahn-Hahn was a German author and founder of a nunnery
 1809, August 19, Sabine Heinefetter, 18 November 1872, operatic soprano
 1811, Josef Kling, was a German chess master and chess composer
 1815, November 21, Karl Ludwig Bernays, Marxist journalist
 1815, 2 April, Johann Baptist Heinefetter, 4 November 1902, Romantic painter
 1817, Christoph Moufang, † 1890 in Mainz, diocesan administrator of Mainz 1877-86
 1823, Ludwig Bamberger, † 1899 in Berlin, was an economist, publicist and politician. He took part in the republican rising in the Palatinate and Baden; it was chiefly owing to him that a gold currency was adopted and that the Reichsbank took form
 1824, Peter Cornelius, † 1874 in Mainz, composer, writer about music, poet and translator
 1835, Paul Haenlein, † 1905 in Mainz, was an engineer and flight pioneer. He flew in a semi-rigid-frame dirigible
 1838, in Mainz, Charles Hallgarten, † 1908 in Frankfurt am Main, was a banker and philanthropist
 1839, Adolphus Busch, † 1913 was the cofounder of Anheuser-Busch
 1846, Ferdinand Becker, † 1877, painter of religious subjects
 1849, May 29, Lorenz Adlon, † April 7, 1921, established Hotel Adlon in Berlin
 1858, July 2, Georg Heinrich Kirstein, † April 15, 1921 in Mainz, bishop of Mainz 1904-21
 1883, Emil Preetorius, † 1973 in Munich, painter and scenic designer, 1948 – 1968 president of the Bayerischen Akademie der Schönen Künste
 1883, Adolf Reinach, German philosopher, phenomenologist (from the Munich phenomenology perspective) and law theorist
 1871, Oskar Heinroth, Ornithologist
 1873, Rudolf Rocker, † 1958 in Mohegan/Maine (USA); was an anarcho-syndicalist writer, historian and prominent activist
 1888, 17 November, Curt Goetz, † 12 September 1960 in Grabs/St. Gallen (Switzerland), Schriftsteller ("Der Lügner und die Nonne", "Das Haus in Montevideo"), playwright, film director
 1892, 6 January Ludwig Berger originally Ludwig Bamberger, † 1969 in Schlangenbad, film director, Shakespeare interpreter
 1900, Anna Seghers, † 1983 in Berlin (East), writer ("Das siebte Kreuz")
 1901, Walter Hallstein, † 1982 in Stuttgart, politician and professor (Hallstein Doctrine) (1950–1951)
 1904, 30 December, Edith Schultze-Westrum, † 20 March 1981 in München, actress ("Die Brücke", D 1959, "Jeder stirbt für sich allein", Hans Fallada 1962)
 1914, 25 December, Konrad Georg, † 8 September 1987 in Hamburg, actor ("Kommissar Freytag", "Tim Frazer")
 1916, Ferdy Mayne, † 1998 in London, actor
1920, 3 November, Peter Ganz, Germanist
1924. Lewis H Gann, Historian of Africa 
 1924, 11 December, Heinz Schenk, †2014, actor, singer ("Es ist alles nur geliehen"), Moderator ("Zum blauen Bock"), text writer ("Ole, ole Fiesta")
 1935, 4 October, Horst Janson, actor ("Der Bastian", Sesamstraße)
 1938, 25 February, Dieter Reith, composer (TV-melodies), band leader
 1942, 18 April, Jochen Rindt, † 1970 Austrian racing driver
 1947, 31 December, Gerhard Ludwig Müller
 1961, 6 December, Manuel Reuter, race car driver
 1963, Matthias Fornoff, tv-journalist
 1968, Anja Gockel, fashion designer

Honorary citizens
 1831: Dr. Georg Moller, Regierungsbaumeister (first honorary citizen)
 1834: Emmanuel von Mensdorff-Pouilly, vice governor of the federal fortress Mainz
 1835: Albert Thorvaldsen, Danish/Icelandic sculptor, creator of the Gutenbergdenkmal
 1839: Prince Wilhelm of Prussia, vice governor of the federal fortress Mainz
 1864 to 1866 Prinz Prince Charles of Prussia was governor of Mainz
 1875: Leopold Hermann von Boyen, governor of the federal fortress Mainz
 1877: Philipp Veit, romantic painter, director of the municipal gallery at Mainz
 1908: Max von Gagern, administrative director of the province Rheinhessen
 1962: Carl Zuckmayer, author
 1964: Félix Kir, catholic priest, resistance fighter and politician
 1965: Dr. Peter Altmeier, first prime minister of Rhineland-Palatinate, co-founder of the Second German Television
 1970: Dr. Ludwig Strecker, director of Schott Music, publisher
 1972: Prof. Fritz Strassmann, chemist who, along with Otto Hahn, and Lisa Meitner discovered the nuclear fission of uranium in 1938
 1975: Hermann Kardinal Volk, Bishop of Mainz
 1981: Marc Chagall, painter, created nine stained-glass windows in St. Stephan Mainz
 1981: Anna Seghers, originally Netty Rádvany, geb. Reiling, author
 1983: Prof. Karl Holzamer, first director general (Intendant) of the Second German Television
 2001: Karl Kardinal Lehmann, Bishop of Mainz
 2004: Karl Delorme, local politician
 2022: Özlem Türeci, Uğur Şahin, Christoph Huber, BioNTech-founders

Other people related specially to Mainz

Scientists
 Johann Joachim Becher (1635–1682), was a physician, alchemist, precursor of Chemistry, scholar, economist and adventurer
 Johann Georg Adam Forster  naturalist, ethnologist, travel writer, journalist and revolutionary. Played a leading role in the Republic of Mainz 1793
Johann Fischer von Waldheim, was a German anatomist, entomologist and paleontologist
Victor Mordechai Goldschmidt (1853–1933), was a German mineralogist, crystallographer, nature philosopher, art collector and sponsor
Gustav Killian (1860–1921), was a German laryngologist
 Romano Guardini (1885–1968), was a Roman Catholic priest, author, and academic
 Fritz Strassmann (1902–1980), was a chemist who, along with Otto Hahn, discovered the nuclear fission of uranium in 1938
Otto Laporte (1902–1971) physicist
Helmut Schoeck (1922–1993), was an Austrian-German sociologist and writer, best known for his work "Envy
 Paul J. Crutzen, is a Dutch Nobel prize winning atmospheric chemist at the Max-Planck-Institut in Mainz
 Ludwig Lindenschmit the Elder (1809–1893), was an important prehistorian, a pioneer of prehistorian research during the 19th century, history painting, Lithography
 Wolfgang Seiler, biogeochemists and climatologists
 Uğur Şahin (born 1965), in Iskenderun, Turkey)  immunologist and physician
 Özlem Türeci (born 1967), in Lastrup, immunologist and businessperson

Politicians
 Nero Claudius Drusus, Consul of the Roman Empire („Drusus-Cenotaph“ in the Zitadelle)
Didius Julianus, Roman Emperor, commanded the Legio XXII Primigenia in Mogontiacum
 Marcus Aurelius Severus Alexander, Roman emperor (222–235) of the Severan dynasty.
 Ulpius Cornelius Laelianus was a usurper against Postumus, the emperor of the Gallic Empire. He declared himself emperor at Mainz in February/March 268
 Jean Bon Saint-André, was a French politician of the Revolution era, became préfet of the départment of Mont-Tonnerre (1801) and commissary-general of the three départments on the left bank of the Rhine
 Franz Erwein von Schönborn-Wiesentheid (1776–1840), German politician and art collector
Ludwig Schwamb (1890–1945) social-democratic jurist and politician who fought against the Nazi dictatorship in Germany as a member of the Kreisau Circle
 Helmut Kohl, politician
 Susanne Wasum-Rainer, diplomat, Germany’s Ambassador to France (since 2012)
 view: List of mayors of Mainz

Architecture, art and culture 
 Hans Backoffen (1470–1519), kurfürstlicher Steinmetz und Bildhauer
 Gottfried Wilhelm Leibniz, Jurist, Mathematiker und Philosoph. Von 1667 – 1674 in Diensten Johann Philipps von Schönborn
 Maximilian von Welsch (1671–1745), electoral director of building, architect, military engineer, famed for his fortifications and civil architecture (Lustschloss Favorite Mainz, New Armory Mainz)
 Emy Roeder (1890–1971), sculptor, since 1950 teacher at the Mainzer Kunstgewerbeschule
 Alois Plum (born 1935), stained glass artist
 Margret Hofheinz-Döring (1910–1994), painter and graphic artist

Literature 
 Marianus Scotus (1028–1082), Irish chronicler
 Kathinka Zitz (1801–1877), writer and political activist
Siegmund Salfeld (1843–1926) German rabbi and writer
Gerd Buchdahl (1914–2001), German-Jewish philosopher of science
 Harald Martenstein (born 1953), author, columnist at Die Zeit
 Hanns-Josef Ortheil, Mainz town chronist
 Friedrich Kellner (1885–1970), author of My Opposition

Sports 
Franco Foda, football manager
Jürgen Klopp, football manager
 Manuel Reuter, racing driver, two-time 24 Hours of Le Mans winner (1989, 1996)
 Jochen Rindt, racing driver, posthumously won the Formula One World Drivers' Championship (in 1970)
 Martin Schmidt, football manager
 Katrin Schultheis, world champion 2007, 2008, 2009, 2011, 2012 artistic cycling
 Sandra Sprinkmeier, world champion 2007, 2008, 2009, 2011, 2012 artistic cycling
 Martin Steffes-Mies, four-time rowing world champion octuple (8x) (1989, 1990, 1991, 1993)
 Vincent Keymer, chess grandmaster

Economy 

Salomon Oppenheim, Jr. (1772–1828), Jewish German banker. He is the founder of the private bank Sal Oppenheim.
Lorenz Adlon created the most luxurious hotel of his time, the Hotel Adlon
Ludwig Bamberger (1823–1899), German banker
 Dr. Hans Friderichs, Bundesminister a. D.
 Beatrice Weder di Mauro, Johannes Gutenberg University of Mainz, Chair of International Macroeconomics Wirtschaftsweise

Religion 
 refer to Bishop of Mainz
 Archbishopric of Mainz
Yaakov ben Yakar (990 – 1064) was a Talmudist, pupil of Gershom ben Judah, and is especially known as the teacher of Rashi
Yehuda ben Meir (also known as Yehuda ha-Kohen or Judah of Mainz was a German-Jewish rabbi, Talmudic scholar and traveler of the late 10th and early 11th century
Karl von Miltitz (1490–1529) was a papal nuncio and a Mainz Cathedral canon
Johann Michael Raich, was a Catholic theologian
Adam Franz Lennig (1803–1866), ultramontanist, established in March 1848 the Piusverein and organized the first Katholikentag

Music, canto
 Heinrich von Meißen, called Frauenlob, was a Middle High German poet and Minnesinger. Since 1312 up to his death 1318 at Peter von Aspelts court in Mainz
 Marianne Müller, (1772–1851) soprano singer at the Königliches Theater of Berlin in 1789–1816
 Gottfried Weber (1799–1839) was a prominent writer on music, especially music theory
 Maria Wilhelmj (1856-1930), composer
 Peter Cornelius, composer, writer about music, poet and translator.
 Volker David Kirchner (1942–2020), violist and composer 
 Gundula Krause, Folk violinist
 Tonka, House music disc jockey and record producer
 Josef Traxel (1916–1975), singer
 Aziza Mustafa Zadeh, Azerbaijani singer, pianist and composer
 Wolf Hoffmann, lead guitarist for Accept
Ian Pooley, musician, record producer and DJ

Cabaret, comedian, carnivalist
 Hanns Dieter Hüsch, cabaret artist

Military 
Louis Baraguey d'Hilliers
Franz von Weyrother
Karl Freiherr von Thüngen

Others 
 Marx Rumpolt, personal chef to the Elector of Mainz, in 1581 wrote the first textbook "Ein New Kochbuch" (A New Cookbook) for professional cooks.
 Johannes Wilhelm Bückler, called Schinderhannes (1783–1803), legendary German outlaw

Sources 
 Wolfgang Balzer: Mainz, Persönlichkeiten der Stadtgeschichte. Kügler, Ingelheim 1985–1993.
 Bd. 1: Mainzer Ehrenbürger, Mainzer Kirchenfürsten, militärische Persönlichkeiten, Mainzer Bürgermeister. 
 Bd. 2: Personen des religiösen Lebens, Personen des politischen Lebens, Personen des allgemein kulturellen Lebens, Wissenschaftler, Literaten, Künstler, Musiker. .
 Bd. 3: Geschäftsleute, epochale Wegbereiter, Baumeister, Fastnachter, Sonderlinge, Originale. .

 
Mainz
History of Mainz
People